Odnoklassniki, abbreviated as OK or OK.ru, is a social network service used mainly in Russia and former Soviet Republics. The site was launched on March 4, 2006 Albert Popkov and is currently owned by VK.

The website currently has more than 200 million registered users and 45 million daily unique visitors. Odnoklassniki also currently has an Alexa Internet traffic ranking of 56 worldwide and 7 for Russia. Odnoklassniki is the second most popular social network in Russia, behind VK (VKontakte) but ahead of Facebook, which is in 3rd place.

History 

Odnoklassniki was launched on March 26, 2006 by Albert Popkov, who lives in London and works in the field of telecommunications. He had taken part in the creation of similar projects in other European countries. From March to November 2006, the project existed as a hobby and was commercially mentioned only in a friendly advertising agency as a platform for advertising. Popkov created a separate legal entity for the service in response to the dramatic increase of the userbase and by July 2007, Odnoklassniki had increased its audience to 4 million users.

In February 2008, British company I-CD accused Popkov of violating their copyright. According to I-CD, Albert Popkov as their employee, worked on their projects 192.com and Passado until his resignation in November 2005. In December 2006 the company raised €10 million to expand Passado in Russia. Popkov allegedly used the proprietary information to create his own site very similar to Passado. He denied those allegations, but was later dismissed as managing director by Odnoklassniki. in November 2009, after the first day of trial in the Royal Courts of Justice, I-CD dropped all charges against Albert Popkov and Odnoklassniki after Albert Popkov and Odnoklassniki agreed to pay them an undisclosed amount in settlement.

On September 15, 2008, Vedomosti reported that Popkov had sold a controlling interest in the network to Digital Sky Technologies (DST), the owner of Mail.ru. DST and its subsidiary Forticom together control 58% of the network. On the previous day, it was announced during a news conference that the network's interface would be translated into Azerbaijani.

Paid registration was introduced in Odnoklassniki in 2008.

In July 2009, Odnoklassniki ranked fifth in terms of monthly reach for an audience of Russian Internet users aged 14–55 among all Russian-language resources.

A service was launched on January 23, 2009, which allows a user to clear their personal page of uninvited guests by removing them from the list of views as well as allowing the blocking access from all users that they are not "friends" with on the service.

After the introduction of paid registration in 2008, the popularity of the site fell sharply and users began to use to the main competitor VKontakte. On August 31, Odnoklassniki canceled user registration fees, and became free again. Odnoklassniki network has more than 45 million registered users. According to TNS Web Index, 56% of the audience are users aged 25–44. The share of managers and specialists is 19% and 28%, respectively.

In early April 2010 beta testing games became available on the site, the developers were i-Jet.

On December 24, 2010, users of Odnoklassniki publicly released the beta version of the video chat.

 On April 7, 2011, the network launched the opportunity to divide friends into groups.
 On May 31, 2011, the network introduced a single authorization. Users became able to use their login and password for authorization on third-party sites.
 On June 1, 2011, the network launched in beta testing a new section, “Music,” in which users can listen to music and upload MP3 files.
On September 27, 2011, users have access to a new top panel "Classmates." It contains links to various projects of Mail.ru Group
 On April 24, 2012, the social network announced the launch of a mobile version of the site localized for Uzbekistan.
On April 26, 2012, the number of registered accounts reached 135 million.
On May 30, 2012, it became possible to use paid services with a zero balance. At the next replenishment of the balance, the amount that was taken on credit is debited from the account.
On June 29, 2012, it became possible to download tracks officially provided by copyright holders.
On October 30, 2012, the head of the social network Ilya Shirokov at the conference “Mail.ru Group Update” announced the launch of Internet radio inside the site.
On October 31, 2012, users were given a free opportunity to change the page design to their liking, choosing from 39 provided themes.
On December 10, 2012, an opportunity appeared to post comments on behalf of the group.
On December 20, 2012, the social network Odnoklassniki announced the translation of the main version of the site into the Uzbek language (Latin)
 On January 1, 2013, According to the site's own statistics, as of January 1, 2013, there were more than 205 million registered users, with daily traffic of about 40 million people.
On February 4, 2013, groups got the opportunity to publish detailed Themes, where users can post tracks to the music collection of Odnoklassniki.
On February 14, 2013, Odnoklassniki reached the mark of 40 million users per day.
On February 16, 2013, Odnoklassniki published Polls.
On March 20, 2013, the “Groups” section was rebuilt and their display and sorting was substantially changed.
On March 25, 2013, the site became available in Armenian.
On April 4, 2013, access to the site was closed to all users, due to technical problems. Since April 5, the site has been working, but with failures: many services are unavailable. Since April 7, the work of the site has been restored.
On April 24, 2013, added the ability to design groups (in which more than 10,000 participants) with individual themes.
On April 30, 2013, a “vote” button appeared, available in groups for photo contests.
At the end of May, 2013, Odnoklassniki entered the Top 10 global social networks
On June 14, 2013, the site became available in Tajik. According to LiveInternet, the number of Odnoklassniki visitors from Tajikistan is 500 thousand people per month, of which more than 20% access the site via mobile devices. According to official reports, the Tajik language was the last in the CIS, on which the Odnoklassniki website will officially be released.
On June 25, 2013, the site created a version for the visually impaired and disabled.
On July 4, 2013, the site became available in English.
Starting July 10, 2013, you can add keywords to each topic in groups - tags. They allow you to group and view publications.
On October 8, 2013, it became possible to search for friends by date of birth.
On October 22, 2013, a function appeared to edit your own comments.
On October 30, 2013, Odnoklassniki app for Windows Phone was updated.
On November 15, 2013, a new service, “Delayed Posting,” appeared. Also on that day, the Help section was updated.
On December 12, 2013, an online movie theater was launched in the Video section.
 Since January 30, 2014, in Odnoklassniki it has become possible to tag yourself in the photographs of your friend.
On February 6, 2014, a search appeared in the “Photo Albums” section of the groups.
Since February 13, 2014, all users have the opportunity to "Share" the video.
Since May 21, 2014, all users have the opportunity to share photos in private messages.
Since May 23, 2014, it became possible to subscribe to the video channel at Odnoklassniki.
July 25, 2014, in the sections "Messages" and "Discussions" there were new emoticons "Emoji".
On August 7, 2014, the social network became available on the new ok.ru domain. The old address was also available.
On August 8, 2014, new themes appeared in the themes gallery, created specifically for the social network by Karim Rashid.
Since September 15, 2014, it has become possible to send videos in messages.
On October 30, 2014, the design of the Messages section was completely updated. Also on this day, the Odnoklassniki Moderator application appeared on Android mobile devices.
 On May 9, 2015, the social network hosted a live broadcast of the Victory Parade and Fireworks in Moscow, as well as in other cities of Russia.
On May 26, 2015, OK launched a new format through which groups can be promoted - a slot in the news feed.
On May 29, 2015, OK launched an affiliate program in which groups will be able to earn money on their content.
On July 22, 2015, they increased the size of uploading images by API to 1680x1680.
On July 22, 2015, Odnoklassniki launched a payout program for vulnerabilities found on the site and external widgets of the service.
On August 11, 2015, video channels appeared in groups.
On September 11, 2015, launched the moderation of publications in groups.
Since September 16, you can promote posts in Odnoklassniki.
On October 1, 2015, Odnoklassniki revealed promo posts - advertising publications in groups that can be targeted to an audience outside the community.
On October 1, 2015, Odnoklassniki revealed “karma” groups. This means that instead of an instant ban for violating the requirements for hosted content, a multi-stage lock was introduced.
October 16, 2015, - Odnoklassniki website added a “Penalty Points” section.
October 22, 2015, - you can transfer videos to video channels using the "Drag & Drop" function.
On November 5, 2015, Odnoklassniki was translated into German and Turkish.
On November 13, 2015, a photo counter appeared.
On November 25, 2015, Odnoklassnik revealed a new advertising format - the publication of video with autorun. Setting up an advertising campaign with such a tool is organized on the myTarget platform and does not differ from a campaign with regular promo posts.
On December 2, 2015, when adding a link to a user group, the user will receive a notification about this. These alerts will be received by moderators both in the web version and in the mobile. In addition, in the mobile version of OK, the removal of group links is now available.
 Beginning of the year 2016:
 Money transfer between users has appeared.
 51 million users per day.
 300 million video views per day.
 OK - the second site in the runet for video views (comScore).
 On March 1, 2016, OK  launched live broadcasts in communities.
On April 1, 2016, new functionality was launched - extending the lockout period and removing users from the group. This applies only to blocked users.
On April 26, 2016, Odnoklassniki launch community news subscriptions.
In April, 2016, the management of Odnoklassniki announced its intention to be the first of the Russian social networks to launch its own messenger - OK Messages. After the tests in a number of CIS countries, the mobile application should also be available to users in the Russian Federation.
On May 13, 2016, Odnoklassniki included the ability to disable posting links in comments and community topics.
On May 26, 2016, Odnoklassniki unveiled their new "OK Video" app for Smart TV, which combines both online cinema and online television.
Instagram integration with Odnoklassniki
 On May 16, 2017, President of Ukraine, Petro Poroshenko, signed a decree implementing the NSDC decision to update the list of sanctions against over 400 Russian companies, leading to Odnoklassniki, VKontakte, Yandex and Mail.ru. and others being blocked by Poroshensko's government in retalliation for the annexation of Crimea. Restrictions to the Odnoklassniki site were set to take effect by June 1.
 In April 2018, Odnoklassniki launched the "Recommendations" service - a personal news feed from new contributors to personal pages or groups
Odnoklassniki began testing new emotions in addition to the already existing Class button. New emotions include "Nice", "Haha", "Grush", "Wow." Each of the above emotions can be amplified with the help of additional expressions: "Super!", "I love", "Ahaha", "Sadness", "Shock".
In December 2018, a video feed appeared on the mobile app of the Odnoklassniki for Android - the ability to view videos and social network broadcasts on one screen in automatic playback mode without being distracted by other content.
 On July 11, 2019, Odnoklassniki launched an ad account for small businesses and content creators.
October 26, 2019, Odnoklassniki launched a portal about art called "We are in the museum", which was planned to compile audio guides voiced by celebrities, as well as art projects, virtual exhibitions and quizzes.
 In May 2022, following the block of Instagram by Roskomnadzor, about 4% of the former Instagram users polled by Zarplata.ru said they had switched to Odnoklassniki.

Service blocking in Ukraine 
In May 2017, Ukrainian President Petro Poroshenko signed a decree to impose a ban on Mail.ru and its widely used social networks including VKontakte and Odnoklassniki as part of its continued sanctions on Russia for its annexation of Crimea and involvement in the War in Donbass. The move was widely criticized as censorship, and Reporters Without Borders condemned the ban, calling it a "disproportionate measure that seriously undermines the Ukrainian people’s right to information and freedom of expression." Respondents in an online poll on the UNIAN site declared that 66% were “categorically against” the ban of Russian sites and another 11% said it would be easier to “ban the whole internet, like in North Korea”.

According to the Internet Association of Ukraine the share of Ukrainian Internet users who visit Odnoklassniki daily had fallen from 35% to 10% from September 2016 to September 2019.

Paid registration and services 
From October 2008 to September 2010, only a limited functionality account could be registered for free. In this version it is impossible to post, upload and rate photos, leave comments in forums and visit other users' pages. In order to use these features, a paid short message had to be sent. In addition, the site provides a number of paid services: deleting ratings and good ratings of their photos, disabling the message that the user is online, providing a wide range of smiles.

Currently, it is free to delete ratings of your photos as well as guests from your watch list.

On August 31, 2010, social network management canceled paid registration. The official reason was "developing new effective ways to combat spammers".

In February 2016, the social network, together with its partner bank VTB 24, introduced the ability to make money transfers between users of the network. Transfers are made between MasterCard, Maestro, Visa payment cards issued by Russian banks and linked to user profiles.

Awards and recognition 

2006 - Runet Award in the Health and Recreation category.
2006 - 4th place in the People's Ten of the Runet Prize.
2007 - Runet Award in the category "Culture and Mass Communications".
2007 - 3rd place in the “People's Ten” Runet Prize
2007 is the "project of the year" in the ROTOR ++ network competition
2007 - the first Russian annual nationwide award in the entertainment industry "Russian Entertainment Awards" in the nomination "Website of the Year".
2008 - Grand Prix in the nomination "Impact on offline" in the network professional competition of the Russian Online TOP (ROTOR) 2008 and ROTOR ++.
2008 - 1st place in the People's Ten of the Runet Prize.
2008 - Grand Prix in the Master of Brandbuilding competition.
2009 - "Disappointment of the year" in the ROTOR network competition
2011 - 3rd place in the Technology and Innovation Runet Prize.
2012 - Venture Village named the site as among 'The Top 10 Russian Internet Brands Out to Conquer the World'

Technology 
The server that hosts odnoklassniki.ru is located in Moscow, Russia on the Golden Telecom network. The programming language used on the site is Java and the main language used for the site's textual content is Russian. The site uses the Apache Tomcat web server.

See also

 List of social networking websites
 Classmates.com
 Nasza klasa (lit. Our class), similar Polish social network website, now defunct
 Mastodon

References

External links
  

Internet properties established in 2006
Russian social networking websites
Russian brands
Internet censorship in Ukraine
Social networking services
Russian websites